= Ongyun =

Island in Myanmar

- Location within Myanmar

Geography
- Location: Ayeyarwady Region
- Coordinates: 16°23′14″N 94°14′34″E

Administration
- Myanmar

Ongyun is an island located in the Ayeyarwady Region of Myanmar. It is located 400 km southwest of the national capital, Naypyidaw.
